"Love Triangle" is a song by American country music singer and songwriter RaeLynn. It was released on August 1, 2016, to country radio through Warner Music Nashville as the lead single from her debut studio album, WildHorse. Co-written by RaeLynn, the song was also written with its producers, Nicolle Galyon and Jimmy Robbins.

Background
In an interview with Peoples Danielle Anderson, RaeLynn said "I was headed to a writing session and my mom and dad were arguing that day about really the stupidest thing. I got to the writing session and there were two of my dearest friends, Jimmy Robbins and Nicolle Galyon, and I started venting about being a kid of divorce. I was like, 'You know what, though? I don't want to be in a sad mood today. Let's just write something fun and sappy.' Then I threw out the title, 'Love Triangle.' I don't remember who said it, but they were like, 'Well if you think about it, you're kind of in a love triangle today. I just think that this song is going to touch a lot of people."

Critical reception
Sounds Like Nashville referred to the song as the focal point of RaeLynn's WildHorse record and stands out among the rest for its clever play on words and brutal honesty about a tough reality. Danielle Anderson of People called it "raw and emotional". Taste of Country's Billy Dukes said the song has a "fairytale quality" and called it "an autobiographical ballad".

The song has sold 158,000 copies in the United States as of May 2017.

Music video
The official music video was released on August 2, 2016.

Charts

Weekly charts

Year-end charts

Certifications

Release history

Covers and other appearances
The song has yet to be fully covered by other artists, but it has twice made an appearance on the reality television singing competition show The Voice, where RaeLynn herself made her debut as an artist.

Though only a few seconds of the performance were seen in a montage, Team Blake (Shelton) members Enid Ortiz of Miami, Florida, and Valerie Ponzio of El Paso, Texas, performed an arrangement of the song in a Battle round on the March 17, 2017, episode of the show's twelfth season.  Despite being a one-chair-turn and a pop singer rather than a country singer, Shelton chose to name Ortiz the winner of the Battle for her surprisingly stronger performance, advancing her to the Knockout rounds, while Ponzio, a four-chair-turn and strong country singer, was eliminated when coaches Adam Levine, Gwen Stefani, and Alicia Keys all opted not to steal her after her surprisingly inferior performance.  Despite the montage appearance, Ortiz and Ponzio's full performance was available on YouTube until March 2019.
On the May 7, 2018, episode of the show's fourteenth season, Team Adam (Levine) member Jacqueline "Jackie" Verna covered the song during the Top 10 performance show.  The performance was not enough to help Verna avoid the bottom three the following episode, however, and she was ultimately eliminated, along with Team Alicia (Keys) member Christiana Danielle, when fellow Team Adam member Rayshun LaMarr won the Instant Save vote via Twitter over both her and Danielle.

References

2016 songs
2016 singles
RaeLynn songs
Warner Records Nashville singles
Songs written by Nicolle Galyon
Songs written by Jimmy Robbins